Parisette is a 1921 French drama film serial directed by Louis Feuillade.

Cast
 Sandra Milovanoff as Parisette
 Georges Biscot as Cogolin
 Fernand Herrmann as Le banquier Stephan
 Édouard Mathé as Pedro Alvarez
 René Clair as Jean Vernier
 Henri-Amédée Charpentier as Le père Lapusse
 Jeanne Rollette as Mélanie Parent (as Jane Rollette)
 Jane Grey as Mme. Stephan
 Pierre de Canolle as Joseph
 Bernard Derigal as Marquis de Costabella (as Derigal)
 Arnaud as Candido
 Gaston Michel

See also
 List of film serials
 List of film serials by studio
 List of longest films by running time

References

External links

1921 films
1921 drama films
French silent feature films
French black-and-white films
Film serials
Films directed by Louis Feuillade
French drama films
Silent drama films
1920s French films